Figure skating at the 1996 Winter Asian Games took place in the city of Harbin, China with four events contested. This edition of the Winter Asiad marks the return of the sport after a ten-year absence. The previous Asian Winter Games were held in Sapporo, Japan.

Medalists

Medal table

References

External links
 OCA official website

 
1996
Asian Games
1996 Asian Winter Games events
1996 Asian Games